This is a list of Swedish ice hockey club Luleå HF's seasons.

References

Lul